Bahadır  is a common masculine Turkish given name. In Turkish, "Bahadır" means "brave", "galahad", "hero", "valiant", and/or "gallant".
This name is written with a dotless ı. It appears as BAHADIR in uppercase and bahadır in lowercase.

Related names
Bahadır is the modern version of "Baghatur".

On the other hand, Mete is a deformed version of "Mo - du" and is also used as a masculine given name by Turkish people. Moreover, Baghatur is also used as a masculine given name by Turkish people as Batur, and as in other cognate forms.

Equivalents
 Arabic: Bahadur (بهادر)
 Georgian: Baadur (ბაადურ)
 Persian: Bahadur (بهادر)
 Urdu: Bahadur (بہادر)
 Turkmen: Batyr

Other Relations
 History: Modu (Possibly a Middle Chinese form (冒頓) of the old Turkic honorific title "bagatur".)
 Turkish: Mete (Turkish form of Modu.)
 Caucasian Mythology: Batraz (Possibly from Turkic "bagatur". This is the name of the leader of the superhuman Narts in Caucasian mythology.)
 Ossetian: Batraz (Батырадз)

Notable people with the name

Given name
 Bahadır Akkuzu (1955–2009), Turkish musician
 Bahadır Alkım (1915–1981), Turkish archaeologist
 Bahadır Demir (1942–1973), Turkish assassinated diplomat
 Bahadır Gökay (born 1955), Turkish painter

Surname
 Abulghazi Bahadur, ruler of the Khanate of Khiva
 Oğuzhan Bahadır (born 1979), Turkish football goalkeeper
 Turgay Bahadır (born 1984), Turkish-Austrian footballer

Turkish-language surnames
Turkish masculine given names